15th London Film Critics Circle Awards
1995

Film of the Year: 
 Schindler's List 

British Film of the Year: 
 Four Weddings and a Funeral 

The 15th London Film Critics Circle Awards, honouring the best in film for 1994, were announced by the London Film Critics Circle in 1995.

Winners
Film of the Year
Schindler's List

British Film of the Year
Four Weddings and a Funeral

Foreign Language Film of the Year
Farewell My Concubine • China

Director of the Year
Steven Spielberg – Schindler's List

British Director of the Year
Mike Newell – Four Weddings and a Funeral

Screenwriter of the Year
Quentin Tarantino – Pulp Fiction

British Screenwriter of the Year
Richard Curtis – Four Weddings and a Funeral

Actor of the Year
John Travolta – Pulp Fiction

Actress of the Year
Linda Fiorentino – The Last Seduction

British Actor of the Year
Ralph Fiennes – Schindler's List

British Actress of the Year
Crissy Rock – Ladybird, Ladybird

Newcomer of the Year
Jim Carrey – The Mask and Ace Ventura: Pet Detective

British Newcomer of the Year
Iain Softley – Backbeat

British Technical Achievement of the Year
Roger Deakins – The Hudsucker Proxy

British Producer of the Year
Duncan Kenworthy – Four Weddings and a Funeral

Special Achievement Award
Hugh Grant – Four Weddings and a Funeral
Barry Norman

Dilys Powell Award
Richard Attenborough

External links
IMDB
Official Website

1
1994 film awards
1994 in London
1994 in British cinema